UnitedHealth Group Incorporated is a for-profit American multinational managed healthcare and insurance company based in Minnetonka, Minnesota. It offers health care products and insurance services. UnitedHealth Group is the world's seventh largest company by revenue and the largest healthcare company by revenue, and the largest insurance company by net premiums. UnitedHealthcare revenues comprise 80% of the Group's overall revenue.

The company is ranked 11th on the 2022 Fortune Global 500. UnitedHealth Group has a market capitalization of $400.7 billion as of March 31, 2021.

History
In 1974, Richard Taylor Burke founded Charter Med Incorporated, a Minnetonka, Minnesota-based privately held company. In 1977, the United HealthCare Corporation was created to reorganize the company and became the parent company of Charter Med. United HealthCare's charter was to manage the newly created Physicians Health Plan of Minnesota, an early Health maintenance organization (HMO). Subsequently, in 1984, the company went public.

In 1988, United HealthCare started its first pharmacy benefit management, through its Diversified Pharmaceutical Services subsidiary. It managed pharmacy benefits delivered both through retail pharmacies and mail. The subsidiary was sold to SmithKline Beecham in 1994 for $2.3 billion.

In 1994, United HealthCare acquired Ramsey-HMO, a Florida insurer. In 1995, the company acquired The MetraHealth Companies Inc. for $1.65 billion. MetraHealth was a privately held company formed by combining the group health care operations of The Travelers Companies and MetLife. In 1996, United HealthCare acquired HealthWise of America, which operated HMOs in Arkansas, Maryland, Kentucky and Tennessee.

In 1998, the company was reorganized as the holding of independent companies UnitedHealthcare, Ovations, Uniprise, Specialized Care Services and Ingenix, and rebranded as "UnitedHealth Group". Also in 1998, United Health Group acquired HealthPartners of Arizona, operator of Arizona's largest AHCCCS provider.

In 2001, EverCare, a UnitedHealth Group subsidiary merged with LifeMark Health Plans In 2002, UnitedHealth Group acquired GeoAccess and Medicaid insurance company AmeriChoice. In 2003, UnitedHealth Group acquired Mid Atlantic Medical Services, an insurer serving Maryland, Washington D.C., Virginia, Delaware and West Virginia. Also in 2003, UnitedHealth Group acquired Golden Rule Financial, a provider of health savings accounts. On July 21, 2003, Exante Bank started operating in Salt Lake City, Utah, as a Utah state-chartered industrial loan corporation. It changed its name to OptumHealth Bank in 2008 and to Optum Bank in 2012.

In April 2004, UnitedHealth Group acquired Touchpoint Health Plan, a Wisconsin health plan. In July 2004, the company acquired Oxford Health Plans.

In December 2005, the company acquired PacifiCare Health Systems. It agreed to divest parts of PacifiCare's commercial health insurance business in Tucson, Arizona and Boulder, Colorado to satisfy antitrust regulator concerns, and also agreed to end its network access agreement with Blue Shield of California. The Tucson business was sold to Cigna. The company acquired Prescription Solutions, another pharmacy benefit manager, as part of its acquisition of PacifiCare Health Systems. This business was later rebranded OptumRx.

In February 2006, the company acquired John Deere Health Care.

In February 2008, the company acquired Sierra Health Services for $2.6 billion. As part of the transaction, to obtain regulatory approval, 25,000 customers were sold to Humana. In July 2009, UnitedHealth Group agreed to acquire Health Net's Northeast licensed subsidiaries for up to $570 million in payments spread out over two years. Through 2010 and into 2011, senior executives of the company met monthly with executives of other health insurers to limit the effect of the health care reform law.

In July 2010, Ingenix acquired Picis Clinical Solutions, Inc., a health information provider for the high-acuity areas of hospitals.

In 2011, Logistics Health, Inc. of La Crosse, Wisconsin, was acquired by OptumHealth. In September 2014, the office buildings where LHI is based were sold to UnitedHealth Group for $45 million.

In February 2012, the company acquired XLHealth, a sponsor of Medicare Advantage health plans with a primary focus on medicare recipients with special needs such as those with chronic illness and those eligible for Medicaid ("dual eligibles"). In October 2012, UnitedHealth Group and Amil Participações, one of the biggest Brazilian health insurance companies, completed the first phase of their merger.

In February 2014, Optum secured a majority stake in the Washington, D.C.-based startup Audax Health. Audax's CEO, Grant Verstandig, continued running the firm alongside COO David Ko. In October 2014, Optum Health acquired the health services unit of Alere for $600 million cash.

In March 2015, it was announced that CatamaranRx will be acquired by OptumRx.

In April 2016, the company announced it was pulling out of all but a "handful" of state healthcare exchanges provided under Affordable Care Act and will continue to sell only in three states in 2017.

In 2017, UnitedHealth's Optum unit acquired Rally Health, a company started by Audax Health's executives. Prior to acquisition, in 2015, UnitedHealth supported Rally Health as a majority investor, and through enrolling 5 million UnitedHealth policy holders in Rally Health's flagship product, RallySM. The close relations between UnitedHealth, Audax Health and Rally Health follows a close personal relationship between Grant Vrestandig (Audax and Rally) and UnitedHealth's President and CFO at the time, David Wichmann.

In June 2019, UnitedHealth's Optum division acquired Davita Medical Group from DaVita Inc. for $4.3 billion. That year, the company also agreed to acquire Equian for $3.2 billion. On June 19, 2019, UnitedHealth acquired the online patient community platform PatientsLikeMe for an undisclosed amount and it will be incorporated into UnitedHealth Group's research division.

In November 2019, Andrew Witty was named president of UnitedHealth, in addition to his role as chief executive of the company's Optum division.

UnitedHealth announced in March 2022 that it would acquire LHC Group for $5.4 billion. The deal will expand its home health capabilities by combining LHC's services with UnitedHealth's Optum unit.

Organizational structure

Optum

The Optum brand was created in 2011 as the company's health services business. Optum is UnitedHealth's technology-focused arm. This division also runs the staffed physical care delivery organizations throughout the United States under various brands as a part of the OptumHealth brand.

UnitedHealthcare
UnitedHealthcare includes four divisions:
 UnitedHealthcare Employer and Individual - provides health benefit plans and services for large national employers
 UnitedHealthcare Medicare and Retirement - provides health and well-being services to individuals age 65 and older.
 UnitedHealthcare Community and State - serves state programs that care for the economically disadvantaged, the medically underserved, and people without the benefit of employer-funded health care coverage, in exchange for a monthly premium per member from the state program.
 UnitedHealthcare Global - serves 6.2 million people with medical benefits, residing principally in Brazil, Chile, Colombia and Peru but also in more than 130 other countries.

Products and services

Health insurance plans
UnitedHealthcare offers commercial group insurance plans across the United States under several product names with different offerings.
 UnitedHealthcare Select is an exclusive provider organization (EPO) with no coverage for out-of-network providers
 UnitedHealthcare Select Plus is a preferred provider organization (PPO).
 UnitedHealthcare Choice functions as a HMO plan with access to specialists, whereas UnitedHealthcare Choice Plus is an HMO which allows for out-of-network coverage.
 UnitedHealthcare Navigate, Charter, and Compass require a primary care physician referral to see a specialist meaning that they are more restrictive managed care plans, similar to point of service plans.

Provider networks
UnitedHealthcare negotiates with providers in periodic contract negotiation; contracts may be discontinued from time to time. High-profile contract disputes can span provider networks across the nation, as in the case of a 2018 dispute with a major emergency room doctor group, Envision Healthcare.

Provider directory
Maintaining up-to-date provider directories is necessary since the Centers for Medicare and Medicaid Services can fine insurers with outdated directories. As a condition of participation, UnitedHealthcare requires that providers notify them of changes, but also has a Professional Verification Outreach program to proactively request information from providers. However, providers are burdened by having to maintain their information with multiple networks (e.g., competitors to UnitedHealthcare). The total cost of maintaining these directories is estimated at $2.1b annually, and a blockchain initiative began in 2018 to share the directory.

Finance 
For the fiscal year 2020, UnitedHealth Group reported earnings of US$15.40 billion, with an annual revenue of US$257.1 billion.

Criticism and controversies

Lobbying
In 2009, according to OpenSecrets, people affiliated with UnitedHealth Group gave a record of $5.52 million to political candidates and groups. The Affordable Care Act was being discussed in Congress at the time. The Affordable Care Act was subsequently passed in the first quarter of 2010. UnitedHealth Group subsequently spent $2.75 million to $4.86 million from 2011 to 2021 and the company went on to pull in $78,692 million in revenue in the fourth quarter of 2021 alone. 

The UnitedHealth Group hired seven different lobbying firms to work on its behalf in 2010. In addition, its corporate political action committee or PAC, called United for Health, spent an additional $1 million on lobbying activities in 2010.

QSSI, a subsidiary of UnitedHealth Group, is one of the 55 contractors hired by United States Department of Health and Human Services to work on the HealthCare.gov web site.

Legal issues
In 2006, the U.S. Securities and Exchange Commission (SEC) began investigating the conduct of UnitedHealth Group's management and directors, for backdating of stock options. Investigations were also begun by the Internal Revenue Service and prosecutors in the U.S. attorney's office for the Southern District of New York, who subpoenaed documents from the company. The investigations came to light after a series of probing stories in the Wall Street Journal in May 2006, discussing apparent backdating of hundreds of millions of dollars' worth of stock options by UHC management. The backdating apparently occurred with the knowledge and approval of the directors, according to the Journal. Major shareholders have filed lawsuits accusing former New Jersey governor Thomas Kean and UHC's other directors of failing in their fiduciary duty. On October 15, 2006, CEO William W. McGuire was forced to resign, and relinquish hundreds of millions of dollars in stock options. On December 6, 2007, the SEC announced a settlement under which McGuire will repay $468 million, as a partial settlement of the backdating prosecution.

In June 2006, the American Chiropractic Association filed a national class-action lawsuit against the American Chiropractic Network (ACN), which is owned by UnitedHealth Group and administers chiropractic benefits, and against UnitedHealth Group itself, for alleged practices in violation of the federal Racketeer Influenced and Corrupt Organizations Act (RICO).

OptumInsight, aka Ingenix
In February 2008, New York State Attorney General Andrew Cuomo announced an industry-wide investigation into a scheme by health insurers to defraud consumers by manipulating reasonable and customary rates. The announcement included a statement that Cuomo intended "to file suit against Ingenix, Inc., its parent UnitedHealth Group, and three additional subsidiaries." Cuomo asserted that his investigation found that rates found in a database of health care charges maintained by Ingenix were lower than what he determined was the actual cost of certain medical expenses. Cuomo said this inappropriately allowed health insurance companies to deny a portion of provider claims, thereby pushing costs down to members.

On January 13, 2009, Ingenix announced an agreement with the New York State attorney settling the probe into the independence of the health pricing database. Under the settlement, UnitedHealth Group and Ingenix would pay $50 million to finance a new, non-profit entity that would develop a new health care pricing database. Ingenix would discontinue its medical pricing databases when the new entity makes its product available. The company acknowledged the appearance of a conflict of interest but admitted no wrongdoing.

On January 15, 2009, UnitedHealth Group announced a $350 million settlement of three class action lawsuits filed in Federal court by the American Medical Association, UnitedHealth Group members, healthcare providers, and state medical societies for not paying out-of-network benefits. This settlement came two days after a similar settlement with Cuomo.

On October 27, 2009, Cuomo announced the creation of FAIR Health, the independent, non-profit organization that will develop a nationwide database for consumer reimbursement, as well as a website where consumers will be able to compare prices before they choose doctors. To fund FAIR Health, the Attorney General's office secured nearly $100 million from insurers such as Aetna, UnitedHealth Group, and Anthem Inc.

Investigations and lawsuits
In 2006, the SEC began investigating the conduct of UnitedHealth Group's management and directors, including Dr. McGuire, as did the Internal Revenue Service and prosecutors in the U.S. attorney's office for the Southern District of New York, who have subpoenaed documents from the company.

The investigations came to light after a series of probing stories in The Wall Street Journal in March 2006, discussing the apparent backdating of hundreds of millions of dollars' worth of stock options—in a process called options backdating—by UnitedHealth Group management.
The backdating apparently occurred with the knowledge and approval of the directors, according to the Journal. Major shareholders have filed lawsuits accusing former New Jersey governor Thomas Kean and UnitedHealth Group's other directors of failing in their fiduciary duty.

Resignation of McGuire
On October 15, 2006, it was announced that William W. McGuire would step down immediately as chairman and director of UnitedHealth Group, and step down as CEO on December 1, 2006, due to his involvement in the employee stock options scandal. Simultaneously, it was announced that he would be replaced as CEO by Stephen Hemsley, who has served as president and COO and is a member of the board of directors. McGuire's exit compensation from UnitedHealth, expected to be around $1.1 billion, would be the largest golden parachute in the history of corporate America.

McGuire's compensation became controversial again on May 21, 2009, when Elizabeth Edwards, speaking on The Daily Show, used it to support her argument for a public alternative to commercial insurance. Edwards stressed the importance of restoring competition in health insurance markets noting that at one point, "the President of UnitedHealth made so much money, that one of every $700 that was spent in this country on health care went to pay him." Since estimates of McGuire's 2005 compensation range from $59,625,444 to $124.8 million, and the revenue of UnitedHealth Group was then $71 billion, it is therefore possible that Mrs. Edwards may have meant that one of every $700 that was spent on UnitedHealth Group premiums went to pay McGuire.

McGuire's settlement with SEC

On December 6, 2007, the SEC announced a settlement under which McGuire was to repay $468 million, including a $7 million civil penalty, as a partial settlement of the backdating prosecution. He was also barred from serving as an officer or director of a public company for ten years. This was the first time in which the little-used "clawback" provision under the Sarbanes-Oxley Act was used against an individual by the SEC. The SEC continued its investigations even after it in 2008 settled legal actions against both UnitedHealth Group itself and its former general counsel.

Medicare overbilling lawsuit
A whistleblower lawsuit, filed in 2011, charges UnitedHealth Group's data analytics division with assisting in defrauding Medicare by boosting risk adjustment scores from Medicare Advantage companies. The suit alleges that UnitedHealth Group subsidiary Ingenix (now OptumInsight) "defrauded the United States of hundreds of millions — and likely billions — of dollars." Former UnitedHealth executive Benjamin Poehling brought the suit under the False Claims Act. The government said it would proceed on claims against two health care companies, UnitedHealth and its Texas subsidiary WellMed Medical Management. In February 2017, a federal judge unsealed the suit after the Department of Justice announced it would join the case.

Richard Cole, and others v. United Healthcare
On April 29, 2019, Judge Robert N. Scola Jr. of the United States District Court for the Southern District of Florida, a cancer survivor, recused himself from a case against United Healthcare, stating that the company's denial of treatment was "immoral and barbaric", and that his opinions regarding the company would prevent him from "deciding this case fairly and impartially."

PacifiCare fine in California 
In 2008, the California Department of Insurance took action against UnitedHealthcare's subsidiary PacifiCare Health Systems, acquired in 2005, ultimately fining UnitedHealthcare around $173 million for an estimated over 900,000 violations of the Unfair Insurance Practices Act; by 2019, the case was still being disputed in court, with the possibility of affirming $91 million in penalties.

CMS fine over Medicare Part D
In 2017, CMS fined UnitedHealthcare after discovering issues in Medicare Part D leading to delays or denials in a 2016 audit.

New Jersey fine in 2018 
The New Jersey Department of Banking and Insurance fined UnitedHealthcare $2.5 million due to various compliance issues; this was the largest fine against a licensee in nine years.

Pennsylvania
UnitedHealthcare assessed $1 million penalty for claims payment violations.

Northern California
United Behavioral Health sued over $5 million in denied claims.

Policy Research ownership

The Lewin Group is a policy research and consulting firm that provides an economic analysis of health care and human services issues and policies.
The organization has existed for about 40 years and has maintained a nonpartisan reputation through its many ownership changes that have occurred over that time.
The Lewin Group was purchased in 2007 by Ingenix, a subsidiary of UnitedHealth Group, but alleges editorial and analytical "independence" from UnitedHealth Group, its parent company.
The Lewin Group discloses its ownership in its reports and on its website. While the Lewin Group does not advocate for or against any legislation, both Democratic and Republican politicians frequently cite the firm's studies to argue for and against various U.S. healthcare reform proposals. For example, Democratic Senator Ron Wyden uses Lewin Group estimates to cite the feasibility of his Healthy Americans Act. Former U.S. Representative Eric Cantor, the former House Republican Whip, has referred to the organization as "the nonpartisan Lewin Group" in arguing against government-funded health insurance proposals.

Several Lewin studies have been used to argue both for and against the inclusion of a public option in national health reform. Lewin clients who often cite its findings include The Commonwealth Fund which recently held up a Lewin study it commissioned to advocate for a public plan. The report showed that legislative proposals would achieve nearly universal coverage and "estimated that a public plan could offer small businesses insurance that is at least 9 percent cheaper than current small-business policies."

However, The Lewin Group has acknowledged that clients sometimes choose not to publicize the results of studies they have commissioned. Indeed, Lewin Group Vice President John Sheils told The Washington Post that "sometimes studies come out that don't show exactly what the client wants to see. And in those instances, they have [the] option to bury the study."  Drug and alcohol treatment are generally covered under UnitedHealth Group and UnitedHealthcare plans, but the exact benefits and coverage offered depend on your policy.

Influencing the research of Yale University economist Zack Cooper

In August 2021, a report from The Intercept revealed that UnitedHealthcare worked behind the scenes to guide Yale University healthcare economist Zack Cooper's research on surprise medical billing. United provided Cooper with anonymous data and made edits to his paper, which blamed physician networks TeamHealth and Emcare for the rise in balance billing. United Health Network CEO Dan Rosenthal later confirmed United's work with Cooper during a deposition in a lawsuit filed against United by TeamHealth. Cooper's work was presented as independent, unbiased academic research before Congress, the White House, the U.S. Department of Justice, the Federal Trade Commission, and numerous media reports.

Underpaying physicians

In late 2021, Tennessee-based physician network TeamHealth sued UnitedHealthcare in the 8th District Court of Clark County, Nevada, alleging the insurer underpaid claims to three of TeamHealth's Nevada-based affiliates. In November 2021, the jury unanimously found United guilty of "oppression, fraud, and malice" in its conduct and awarded TeamHealth $2.65 million in compensatory damages. In December, the jury reconvened to determine punitive damages and awarded TeamHealth $60 million. TeamHealth plans to pursue similar legal action against United and other insurers in New Jersey, Pennsylvania, New York, Florida, Oklahoma, and Texas.

Change Healthcare
In February 2022, the United States Department of Justice sued to stop UnitedHealth Group's $8 billion acquisition of Change Healthcare, arguing that the deal would give UnitedHealth access to its competitors' data and ultimately push up healthcare cost. The Justice Department said that UnitedHealth knew that access to claims would give it a view into rival health plans at Humana, Anthem Inc, CVS Health, Aetna, and Cigna.

Foundations
UnitedHealth Group has two foundations, the United Health Foundation and UnitedHealthcare Children's Foundation which were formed in 1999. Since established by UnitedHealth Group in 1999 as a not for profit private foundation, the United Health Foundation has committed more than $170 million to improve health and health care.

Notes

References

External links
 

 UnitedHealth Group Incorporated recipient profile on USAspending.gov

Companies listed on the New York Stock Exchange
Companies in the Dow Jones Industrial Average
Companies based in Minnetonka, Minnesota
Financial services companies established in 1977
American companies established in 1977
Health care companies established in 1977
1977 establishments in Minnesota
Health care companies based in Minnesota
Health insurance companies of the United States
Pharmacy benefit management companies based in the United States